The third Jones government was a Labour–Liberal Democrat coalition government formed after the results of the 2016 general election in Wales. On 14 October 2016, Dafydd Elis-Thomas left Plaid Cymru in order to support the coalition government and to give them a ruling majority; he later sat as an independent in the Senedd. The government was replaced by the Drakeford government on 13 December 2018, following the resignation of Carwyn Jones as First Minister the previous day.

Appointment 
Following a vote in the Assembly to nominate an individual to become First Minister on 11 May 2016 both Jones and Plaid Cymru's Leanne Wood tied on 29 votes each and another vote was automatically scheduled for the following week.

Under the Government of Wales Act 2006, if a First Minister is not elected within 28 days of the Assembly elections, those elections would need to be repeated.

Following negotiations with the Plaid Cymru leader, a second vote on 18 May saw an unopposed Jones re-elected as First Minister, enabling him to begin the process of forming a minority government. He was sworn in as First Minister on 19 May, after which he said that he was "delighted to introduce the team who will be taking Wales forward over the next five years". Among his appointments was the former Welsh Liberal Democrat leader Kirsty Williams, who became Minister for Education.

Cabinet

Ministers

Counsel General

See also
Shadow Cabinet (Wales)
Members of the 5th National Assembly for Wales

References

Notes

Welsh governments
Ministries of Elizabeth II
Coalition governments of the United Kingdom
2016 establishments in Wales
Cabinets established in 2016